Kotha Pelli Koothuru ( Newly Married Bride) is a 1985 Telugu-language drama film, produced by I. Seshu Babu under the Jhansi Pictures banner and directed by K. S. Rami Reddy. It stars Chandra Mohan, Vijayashanti, Rajendra Prasad  and music composed by K. V. Mahadevan.

Plot
Dr. Pratap (Haranath) works in the Indian army, leads a happy family life with his wife Janaki (Annapurna) and a baby girl Sujatha. Once, he is seriously injured on the battlefield when he reveals Janaki regarding his relationship with a nurse Lakshmi and they have a child too. Before dying, he takes a word from Janaki to protect them. So, she reaches their village, by that time, Lakshmi dies. Hence, Janaki endorses the kid's responsibility to Lakshmi's neighbor Veera Swamy (Gollapudi Maruthi Rao) and his wife Parvati (Rama Prabha) by allotting Rs.1 lakh to his nurture. After some time, perturbed Janaki proceeds to get back the child with her father Visweswara Rao (Raavi Kondala Rao), till then Veera Swamy leaves the village. Years roll by, actually devious Veera Swamy fled away, leaving Lakshmi's child as an orphan. Vijay (Chandra Mohan) is a sincere journalist is the nephew of Veera Swamy is grown along with his cousin Swapna (Vanitha Sri). He dislikes Veera Swamy's manipulations, so he quits the house. Sujatha (Vijaya Shanti), likes the ideologies of Vijay and falls for him. Besides, Swapna poses herself as a daughter of a millionaire for false prestige. Holding it Raja (Rajendra Prasad) a petty thief and also partner of Veera Swamy traps her, without knowing her identity and she becomes pregnant. To keep up his honor, Veera Swamy decides to couple up Swapna with Vijay when he is aware of Vijay & Sujatha's nuptial. So, he attributes culpability to Vijay and stops the wedding. Here Janaki recognizes Veera Swamy and asks for their child. Now Veera Swamy contacts Raja as their heir to grab the property. Then, Swapna recognizes Raja where Veera Swamy makes a deal to perform their alliance only after succeeding in their plan. At present, Raja enters the house, but Sujatha suspects something fishy. Thereby, with the help of Vijay, she finds Raja's original father Simhachalam (Kakarala). Accordingly, with a play, they bring out the reality. At last, surprising, it reveals that Raja is only the heir whom Veera Swamy had fostered to Simhachalam before leaving the village. Finally, the movie ends on a happy note with the marriages of Vijay with Sujatha and Raja with Swapna.

Cast
Chandra Mohan as Vijay
Vijayashanti as Sujatha
Rajendra Prasad as Raja
Gollapudi Maruthi Rao as Veera Swamy
Raavi Kondala Rao as Visweswara Rao
Haranath as Dr. Pratap
Kakarala as Simhachalam
Potti Prasad as Dance Master
Chitti Babu as Jimbo
Annapurna as Janaki
Rama Prabha as Parvathi 
Anuradha as item number
Vanitha Sri as Swapna

Soundtrack

Music composed by K. V. Mahadevan. Music released on EMI Columbia Company.

Other
 VCDs and DVDs on - HYDERABAD Video Company, Hyderabad

References

Indian drama films
Films scored by K. V. Mahadevan
1980s Telugu-language films